A special election to the United States House of Representatives for North Carolina's 4th congressional district was held August 4, 1870.

The winning candidate would serve in the United States House of Representatives to represent North Carolina in the 41st Congress until the General election on November 26, 1870.

Background 
Incumbent U.S. Representative John T. Deweese resigned his seat on February 28, 1870 before he was censured by the House of Representatives on March 1, 1870, for selling an appointment to the Naval Academy. A special election was held to replace his seat.

Candidates

Conservative

Nominee 
 Robert B. Gilliam, state representative and speaker of the North Carolina house (Also identified as a Democrat)

Republican

Nominee 
 Madison Hawkins, politician who later became the Chief of the US Census Bureau in northeastern NC (1890)

General election

Aftermath 
Representative-elect Robert B. Gilliam, died before taking office, necessitating the November 26 special election.

See also 
 United States House of Representatives elections, 1866
 United States House of Representatives elections, 1868

References 

North Carolina 1870 04
North Carolina 1870 04
1870 04 Special
North Carolina 04 Special
United States House of Representatives 04 Special
United States House of Representatives 1870 04